The Roman Catholic Archdiocese of Owerri (Latin: Archidioecesis Overriensis) is located in Owerri, Imo State, Nigeria. The Seat of Wisdom Seminary is in Owerri. The archdiocese covers an area of 2,996 km2. 670,986 of the 1.7 million people in the area are member of the Catholic Church.

History
The diocese dates back to the Vicariate Apostolic of Owerri, which was created on February 12, 1948, when the Vicariate Apostolic of Onitsha-Owerri was split. On April 18, 1950, it was elevated to a diocese. On March 26, 1994, it became an Archdiocese.

On 27 December 2020, auxiliary bishop Moses Chikwe and his driver were kidnapped by gunmen in Owerri.  They were both released unharmed and without ransom, on 1 January 2021.

Bishops

Ordinaries
 Vicar Apostolic of Owerri (Latin Church)
 Joseph Brendan Whelan, C.S.Sp. 12 Feb 1948  – 18 Apr 1950; see below
 Bishops of Owerri (Roman rite)
 Joseph Brendan Whelan, C.S.Sp. 18 Apr 1950  – 25 Jun 1970; see above
 Mark Onwuha Unegbu 25 Jun 1970  – 1 Jul 1993
 Anthony J.V. Obinna 1 Jul 1993 – 1993; see below
 Metropolitan Archbishops of Owerri (Roman rite)
 Anthony John Valentine Obinna 26 Mar 1994 – 6 Mar 2022; see above
 Lucius Iwejuru Ugorji since 6 Mar 2022; see above

Auxiliary bishop
Moses Chikwe (2019-)

Other priest of this diocese who became bishop
Augustine Ndubueze Echema, appointed Bishop of Aba in 2019

Suffragan Dioceses
 Aba 
 Ahiara 
 Okigwe 
 Orlu 
 Umuahia

See also
 Roman Catholicism in Nigeria

References

External links
Official website of the Archdiocese of Owerri, Nigeria
Catholic Hierarchy
Diocese information at the Catholic Bishops Conference of Nigeria 
 GCatholic.org Information
Seat of Wisdom Seminary
Seat of Wisdom Seminary 

Roman Catholic dioceses in Nigeria
Archdiocese of
 
Roman Catholic bishops of Owerri